Radhika Fox is an American government official who is currently the assistant administrator for water at the Environmental Protection Agency.

Education 
Fox received her Bachelor of Arts degree from Columbia University in 1995, where she majored in philosophy and religion, and a master's in city and urban planning from the University of California, Berkeley.

Career 
She directed policy and government affairs for the San Francisco Public Utilities Commission and served as the federal policy director at PolicyLink before joining the US Water Alliance, where she was CEO from 2015 to 2021. and concurrently worked as the director of the Value of Water Coalition.

Biden administration
On January 20, 2021, Fox was appointed by President Biden to the position of assistant administrator for water at the Environmental Protection Agency. She was confirmed by the United States Senate on June 16, 2021, by a vote of 55-43.

Personal life 
Fox is of Indian American descent. Her grandmother lived in the Guntur district of Andhra Pradesh, where Fox lived while her parents completed training in the United States.

References 

Women government officials
People of the United States Environmental Protection Agency
American politicians of Indian descent
Columbia College (New York) alumni
University of California, Berkeley alumni
Living people
Year of birth missing (living people)
Biden administration personnel